The Rapid City Marshals are a professional indoor football team set to begin play as a member of Champions Indoor Football for the 2022 season.  Based in Rapid City, South Dakota, the Marshals will play their home games at the Summit Arena at The Monument.

History
The Marshals will be the third indoor football team to be based in Rapid City following the Black Hills Red Dogs (2000–2005) and the Rapid City Flying Aces (2006).

On April 30, 2021, Keith Russ and Tel Koan, owners of fellow Champions Indoor Football (CIF) teams the Wyoming Mustangs and Billings Outlaws, announced launch of another CIF team to be based in Rapid City with their name, logo, and color scheme. The Marshals name was chosen to reflect the Rapid City area's passion for the Old West, as well as to provide a contrast to their CIF league-mates the Billings Outlaws and Sioux City Bandits.

Notes

External links
 Official website

Champions Indoor Football teams
American football teams in South Dakota
Sports in Rapid City, South Dakota
American football teams established in 2021
2021 establishments in South Dakota